Gastón Manuel Romano (born 25 March 1998), known as Chapi Romano, is an Argentine footballer who plays as a midfielder.

Club career
On 27 January 2023, Romano's contract with Taranto was terminated by mutual consent.

Career statistics

Club

Notes

References

1998 births
Living people
Footballers from Buenos Aires
Argentine footballers
Association football midfielders
Argentine Primera División players
Club Atlético River Plate footballers
Club Atlético Huracán footballers
S.C. Espinho players
C.F. Estrela da Amadora players
Taranto F.C. 1927 players
Campeonato de Portugal (league) players
Liga Portugal 2 players
Serie C players
Argentine expatriate footballers
Argentine expatriate sportspeople in Portugal
Expatriate footballers in Portugal
Argentine expatriate sportspeople in Italy
Expatriate footballers in Italy